Liudmyla Volodymyrivna Luzan (born 27 March 1997) is a Ukrainian sprint canoeist. She is silver and bronze Olympic medalist, three-time World champion and three-time European champion.

Career
Luzan participated at the 2014 Summer Youth Olympics where she won a silver medal in C-1. She qualified at the 2020 Summer Olympics, in the C-1 200 meters, and C-2 500 meters. 

On 5 August 2021, at the 2020 Tokyo, she won bronze in the singles canoe at a distance of 200 meters. Lyudmila Luzan from the first place went to the final swim. She only snatched the award for Ukraine in the last meters. 
 She also won silver in women's C-2 500 m with Anastasiia Chetverikova.

References

External links

Ukrainian female canoeists
Living people
1997 births
Canoeists at the 2014 Summer Youth Olympics
European Games competitors for Ukraine
Canoeists at the 2019 European Games
Olympic canoeists of Ukraine
Canoeists at the 2020 Summer Olympics
Medalists at the 2020 Summer Olympics
Olympic silver medalists for Ukraine
Olympic bronze medalists for Ukraine
Olympic medalists in canoeing
Sportspeople from Ivano-Frankivsk
ICF Canoe Sprint World Championships medalists in Canadian
20th-century Ukrainian women
21st-century Ukrainian women